Fabritskoye is a rural locality (a selo) in Skoritskoye Rural Settlement, Repyovsky District, Voronezh Oblast, Russia. The population was 222 as of 2010. There are 3 streets.

Geography 
Fabritskoye is located 19 km east of Repyovka (the district's administrative centre) by road. Prudovy is the nearest rural locality.

References 

Rural localities in Repyovsky District